Wojciech Rutkowski (19 November 1935 – 29 May 1994) was a Polish volleyball player. He competed in the men's tournament at the 1968 Summer Olympics.

References

External links
 

1935 births
1994 deaths
Volleyball players from Warsaw
Polish men's volleyball players
Olympic volleyball players of Poland
Volleyball players at the 1968 Summer Olympics
Legia Warsaw (volleyball) players